John Stratford, 3rd Earl of Aldborough (–1823) was an Irish peer and member of the House of Stratford. He was known as the Hon. John Stratford until 1801, when he inherited the Earldom from his brother Edward Stratford, 2nd Earl of Aldborough.

Background
He was the second son of John Stratford, 1st Earl of Aldborough, and his wife Martha O'Neale, daughter of the Venerable Benjamin O'Neale, of Mount Neale, County Carlow; sometime Archdeacon of Leighlin.

Career
In 1763, Stratford replaced his father as Member of Parliament (MP) for Baltinglass upon the latter's elevation to the peerage. He held this seat until 1777. In 1776, he was returned to the Irish House of Commons for Wicklow County, replacing Ralph Howard, who had left the House to be elevated to the peerage as Baron Clonmore, and chose to sit for Wicklow in preference to Baltinglass. From 1790, he sat again for Baltinglass until the termination of the Irish Parliament in 1800 by the Act of Union. At the beginning of 1801, he succeeded his older brother Edward as earl.

In 1795, Stratford was appointed Governor of County Wicklow.

Family
In April 1777, he married Elizabeth Hamilton, eldest daughter of Reverend Frederick Hamilton, Archdeacon of Raphoe and son of Lord Archibald Hamilton, and they had several daughters:

 Elizabeth, named after her mother, married John Halliday, later Tollemache, and had John Tollemache, 1st Baron Tollemache. 
 Louisa-Martha (1748–1814), married Hon. John Rodney, son of George Rodney, 1st Baron Rodney
 Emily (died 1863), married Thomas Best (died 1829). 
 Maria married James Tate of Ballintaggart House, County Kildare.

His granddaughter Marcia (née Tate, d.1893) married Anthony Lyster of Stillorgan (1797-1880) in 1825 and were the parents of Lieutenant General Harry Hammon Lyster VC.

Stratford died at Belan House in County Kildare in 1823 and lacking male issue, he was succeeded in his titles by his younger brother Benjamin. His wife died in 1845.

References

John
1740s births
1823 deaths
Irish MPs 1761–1768
Irish MPs 1769–1776
Irish MPs 1776–1783
Irish MPs 1783–1790
Irish MPs 1790–1797
Irish MPs 1798–1800
Members of the Parliament of Ireland (pre-1801) for County Wicklow constituencies
Earls of Aldborough